Lynch is a home rule-class city in Harlan County, Kentucky, United States. In the 2010 census, the city population was 747, down from 900 in 2000.

History

Lynch was plotted in 1917 by the U.S. Coal and Coke Company (a subsidiary of U.S. Steel) as a company town to house workers at the company's nearby coal mines. It was named for then-head of the company, Thomas Lynch.

By the 1940s, Lynch had a population of 10,000 and had such amenities as a hospital and movie theater. The population declined dramatically in the 1960s and 1970s as mining techniques shifted to less labor-intensive methods.

In 1996, the rails to Lynch and nearby Benham were officially abandoned.

In 2012, PBS of Eastern Tennessee created a documentary titled The Eastern Kentucky Social Club dealing with the history of the black community and immigrant community in Lynch.

Geography
Lynch is located in eastern Harlan County at  (36.965133, -82.916569), in the valley of Looney Creek. Lynch is the nearest city to Kentucky's highest point, Black Mountain.

Lynch is Kentucky's highest incorporated city. It is bordered by  Looney Ridge to the north and  Benham Spur to the south.

Demographics

As of the census of 2000, there were 900 people, 408 households, and 250 families residing in the city. The racial makeup of the city was 73.33% White, 24.89% Black or African American, 0.33% Native American, and 1.44% from two or more races. Hispanic or Latino of any race were 0.33% of the population.

There were 408 households, out of which 24.0% had children under the age of 18 living with them, 40.7% were married couples living together, 16.2% had a female householder with no husband present, and 38.5% were non-families. 36.8% of all households were made up of individuals, and 20.1% had someone living alone who was 65 years of age or older. The average household size was 2.21 and the average family size was 2.88.

In the city, the population was spread out, with 22.6% under 18, 8.9% from 18 to 24, 20.4% from 25 to 44, 28.2% from 45 to 64, and 19.9% who were 65 or older. The median age was 43 years. For every 100 females, there were 82.6 males. For every 100 females age 18 and over, there were 80.1 males.

The median income for a household in the city was $17,609, and the median income for a family was $21,625. Males had a median income of $31,500 versus $19,038 for females. The per capita income for the city was $13,369. About 36.7% of families and 37.8% of the population were below the poverty line, including 57.6% of those under age 18 and 25.9% of those age 65 or over.

Notable people
Leland Byrd, College basketball coach and player
Juanita M. Kreps, United States Secretary of Commerce
Louise Slaughter, United States politician

See also
Lynch Historic District
Benham-Lynch State Resort Park, proposed

References

External links
History and Pictures of Lynch, KY

Cities in Harlan County, Kentucky
Populated places established in 1917
Company towns in Kentucky
Coal towns in Kentucky
Cities in Kentucky
U.S. Steel